Clara Skinner (1902–1976) was an American printmaker known for her woodcuts. 

Her work is included in the collections of the Seattle Art Museum, the Dallas Museum of Art the National Gallery of Art, Washington and the Metropolitan Museum of Art.

References

1902 births
1976 deaths
20th-century American women artists